Lynn C. Woolsey (born November 3, 1937) is an American politician who served as the U.S. representative for  from 1993 to 2013. A member of the Democratic Party, her district included all of Marin County and most of Sonoma County.

She was a member of the Congressional Progressive Caucus, and was its co-chair from 2010 until her retirement in 2013. Woolsey, who described herself as "the first former welfare mother to serve in Congress," was one of two members of the House known to have previously been on welfare; the other is Congresswoman Gwen Moore (D-WI).

On June 28, 2011, Woolsey announced that she would not run for re-election in the 2012 election. She was succeeded in her North Bay district by Jared Huffman.

Early life, education and career
Woolsey was born in Seattle, Washington. Woolsey graduated from Lincoln High School in 1955. She was educated at the University of Washington, where she became a member of Alpha Phi sorority, but left school early to be married. She moved to Marin County in Northern California and enrolled at the University of San Francisco.

Her husband left the family, leaving Woolsey to raise her three children alone. She received public assistance to make ends meet while working and finishing her education. She remarried and raised another child. She later became a human resources manager and business owner, a teacher at the College of Marin and the Dominican University of California, and a member of the Petaluma, California, City Council before running for Congress.

U.S. House of Representatives

Political campaigns

In 1992, five-term Congresswoman Barbara Boxer gave up her seat to make a successful run for the Senate.  Woolsey entered a nine-way Democratic primary. Seven of her opponents lived in Marin County and split that county's vote, allowing Woolsey to win the nomination with 26 percent of the vote. In the general election, she faced Republican Assemblyman Bill Filante, who was diagnosed with a brain tumor and did not actively campaign. Woolsey won with 65 percent of the vote.

Woolsey was reelected eight times with no substantial opposition.

Tenure

Woolsey was ranked as the most liberal member of Congress in 2012 by That's My Congress.

Welfare reform 

She quickly made her presence known, drawing upon her experience in vocal opposition to the major welfare reform initiative negotiated by House Speaker Newt Gingrich and President Bill Clinton in the mid-1990s. She later led efforts to restore programmatic funding for services such as child care, nutrition, and paid parental leave. She also passed legislation increasing the power of the IRS to enforce payment of delinquent child support.

Iraq

Woolsey was an outspoken opponent of the War in Iraq. On October 10, 2002, she was among 133 members of the House who voted against authorizing the invasion of Iraq. She took an active role in opposing continued U.S. presence, leading 15 members of Congress in writing a letter to President George W. Bush dated January 12, 2005, calling for the withdrawal of U.S. from Iraq. She also among the first Members of Congress to call for a troop withdrawal, when she introduced H.Con. Res. 35 on January 26, 2005. Woolsey gave war protester Cindy Sheehan a guest pass to attend Bush's 2006 State of the Union speech. Sheehan's attendance at the speech became noted when she was arrested for wearing a T-shirt with a political message. In the lead up to the 2008 elections, Woolsey, encouraged leaders of anti-war groups to field primary challenges to any Democrat who refused to support a vote ending the war in Iraq. In response, 15 members of the Blue Dog Coalition, a conservative-centrist group within the Democratic Party caucus in the House Representatives in safe seats, refused to contribute party dues to the Democratic Congressional Campaign Committee (DCCC). Woolsey later stated that she was misunderstood, but the Blue Dogs continued the boycott.

Indian gaming 

Woolsey introduced the Graton Rancheria Restoration Act on August 6, 1998. It was signed by President Clinton as Title XIV of the Omnibus Indian Advancement Act in December 2000.

Woolsey testified in support of H.R. 946, citing her approval for the clause restricting gaming on land that is "taken into trust for the tribes."

Woolsey's original bill (H.R. 4434, later H.R. 946) would not have permitted the Federated Indians of Graton Rancheria to have an Indian casino. Senator Barbara Boxer removed that prohibition when she included Woolsey's bill in the Omnibus Act.

In response, Woolsey introduced H.R. 2656 (which never left the House Resources Committee) and appeared frequently at local town-hall meetings, saying that the Miwok Indians double-crossed her by seeking to legalize gambling on their reservation.

Scouting for All Act 

In September 2000, Woolsey sponsored H.R. 4892, the Scouting for All Act, to revoke the charter held by the Boy Scouts of America.

Recognition of Ramadan 

On December 11, 2007, Woolsey, along with 8 other Democrats, voted ‘nay’ on a resolution to recognize the importance of "Christmas and the Christian faith" but did vote to "recognize the commencement of Ramadan",’ a Muslim religious observance in October.

Health care 

Woolsey introduced a bill to revive the public option on July 22, 2010. The Congressional Budget Office projected that the legislation would save $68 billion between 2014 and 2020.

She was strongly critical of the Stupak-Pitts Amendment, which prevents private health insurance plans from covering abortion if the plan is subsidized by tax breaks in the context of the November 2009 Affordable Health Care for America Act.

Committee assignments
Committee on Education and the Workforce
Subcommittee on Early Childhood, Elementary and Secondary Education
Subcommittee on Workforce Protections (Ranking Member)
Committee on Science, Space and Technology
Subcommittee on Energy and Environment

Caucuses
Congressional Progressive Caucus (Co-Chair)

Controversies

Stewart Pearson letter 
On December 2, 2003, Woolsey wrote a letter on behalf of Stewart Pearson, the son of one of her senior aides, who had pleaded guilty to rape. In a letter written on her official congressional stationery, she asked the judge to consider mitigating circumstances and show leniency. The judge in the case was not swayed by the letter, and sentenced Pearson to eight years in prison, the maximum allowed under the plea bargain. Woolsey has apologized for writing the letter, saying she did not know all the facts; the victim did not accept her apology.

Objection to 2004 presidential election results
Woolsey was one of thirty-one House Democrats who voted to not count the electoral votes from Ohio in the 2004 presidential election. President George W. Bush won Ohio by 118,457 votes. Without Ohio's electoral votes, the election would have been decided by the U.S. House of Representatives, with each state having one vote in accordance with the Twelfth Amendment to the United States Constitution.

Darfur protest arrest
Woolsey was arrested April 27, 2009, outside the embassy of Sudan in Washington, D.C., during a protest against genocide in Darfur.  Woolsey and four other U.S. lawmakers were protesting the blocking of aid to victims.  They were arrested on a charge of trespassing after they crossed a police line.

Other Democratic House members arrested were Jim McGovern, Donna Edwards, Keith Ellison and John Lewis.

Legacy
Woolsey's congressional papers are preserved in Special Collections and University Archives at the Sonoma State University Library.

Electoral history

See also
 Women in the United States House of Representatives

References

External links
 

Articles
Out of Iraq: By Reps. Lynn Woolsey & Barbara Lee
A Progressive State of the Union By Barbara Lee and Lynn Woolsey
The Progressive Promise By Rep. Lynn Woolsey
California Rep. Lynn Woolsey Receives Peace Award from Christian Quaker Lobby
Metroactive: Lynn Woolsey and the American way
American Prospect: Communication Breakdown by Rep. Lynn Woolsey
Statement Opposing Military Action in Iraq Rep. Lynn Woolsey
Woolsey's Tie to Indian Gaming (Marin IJ)
Dry Creek Indian Gaming Coming to Petaluma?
HR2656 

|-

|-

1937 births
20th-century American politicians
20th-century American women politicians
21st-century American politicians
21st-century American women politicians
American Presbyterians
Female members of the United States House of Representatives
Living people
Democratic Party members of the United States House of Representatives from California
People from Petaluma, California
Politicians from Seattle
University of San Francisco alumni
Women in California politics